New Zealand's Law Commission was established in 1986 by the Law Commission Act 1985. The Commission is an independent Crown entity as defined in the Crown Entities Act 2004.

The main objective of the Law Commission, as declared in its founding legislation, is to monitor and critically analyse the laws of New Zealand with a view to identifying—and proposing solutions to—their possible shortcomings. The Law Commission reviews, reforms and develops New Zealand law. It then makes recommendations to Government to improve the law. It also advises its Responsible Minister and government agencies on how to make the law more accessible and easier to understand.

The Commission has a commitment to consult the public on areas of law that it reviews. It promotes discussion and consultation by publishing Issues Papers. It invites submissions from the public before it makes recommendations to the Responsible Minister. It publishes these recommendations in a report to Parliament. The Minister tables the report and the government then decides whether and how it will amend the law.

The commission is part of the Commonwealth Association of Law Reform Agencies.

Current Commissioners

As of June 2022, the Law Commission comprises four commissioners:

Amokura Kawharu (President) 
Claudia Geiringer
Geof Shirtcliffe 
The Hon Justice Christian Whata

Projects 
The Commission's projects have included:

Review of Abortion Law Reform
The Use of DNA in Criminal Investigations
Review of the Property (Relationships) Act 1976
Declaratory Judgments
Second Review of the Evidence Act 2006

See also
Public sector organisations in New Zealand
Grant Hammond – President of the Commission 2010–2016
Geoffrey Palmer (politician) – President of the Commission 2005-2010
Amokura Kawharu – President of the Commission from 2020

References

External links
Law Commission's official website
Law Commission Act 1985

New Zealand independent crown entities
Law Commission
Law commissions
1986 establishments in New Zealand
Law reform in New Zealand